The 2019 US Open 9-Ball Championship was an international pool tournament in the discipline 9-Ball, held from 21–26 April 2019 in Las Vegas, United States. It was the 43rd entry of the U.S. Open 9-Ball Championships. Germany's Joshua Filler won the event with a 13–10 final victory against Wu Jiaqing to win his first US Open championship.

The defending champion was Jayson Shaw, however Shaw was defeated by Filler in the last 16.

Tournament format
The event featured a full roster of 256 players.

Prize fund 
The tournament prize fund was a total of $300,000 with the winner receiving $50,000.

References

External links
 

 US Open 9-Ball Championships 2016 at sixpockets.de

Sports competitions in Las Vegas
U.S. Open
U.S. Open
U.S Open 9-Ball championship
US Open 9-Ball